The Lumbardhi i Pejës, or Peć Bistrica ( or Bistrica e Pejës,  / Pećka Bistrica), is a river in Kosovo. This 62 km-long right tributary to the White Drin river flows entirely within the south-western part of Kosovo.

Name 

The river's name, Lumbardh, literally translates to White River in Albanian. The adjective, i Pejës, differentiates it from the other Lumbardh tributaries of the White Drin in the Dukagjini area.

The name Bistrica means "clearwater" in Serbian. The adjective Pećka derived from "Peć", the Serbian version of Peja. It is added to distinguish it from other Bistrica rivers in the region: Deçan Bistrica, Lumbardhi i Prizrenit, Baba Loc's Lumbardh, Lloqan's Lumbardh, etc.

Upper course 

It flows to the south and initially receives many small streams coming down from the neighbouring mountains of Hajla, Micinat and Bogićevica. Passing next to the villages of Bogë, Duganjive and Kuqishtë, on the northern tip of the Micinat mountain it turns east into the Rugova gorge.

Rugova Gorge 

The short but powerful Lumbardhi i Pejës carved the impressive Rugova Canyon, between the mountains of Zhleb mountain on the north, and Kopranik, the northern extension of the Accursed Mountains, on the south.

The power of the water cut its way not only through the limestone and slate, but also through the terrain made of marble and serpentine. The upper part of the gorge is the glacial trough of the ancient, 25 km-long, Rugova glacier.

The gorge is sparsely inhabited (the village of Shtupeq i Vogël).

Lower course 

As it comes out of the gorge, Peja's Lumbardh reaches the town of Peja and enters the bottom of the Dukagjini depression through which it flows for the rest of its course. It runs parallel to the flows of the White Drin to the north and Deçan's Lumbardh to the south, next to the villages of Kastrat, Babiq, Gllavigjicë, Jabllanicë, Grabanicë and Zajm, before it empties into the White Drin south of the town of Klina.

Characteristics 

The Lumbardhi i Pejës has a large potential for the production of hydroelectricity, but this resource is not used. Also, the river is known for its abundance in fish, most notably, trout.

The river valley, including the Rugova Canyon, is a route for the road connecting Kosovo with Montenegro, over the Cakor pass.

Through the White Drin, Peja's Lumbardh belongs to the Adriatic Sea drainage basin. The river drains an area of  itself and it is not navigable.

See also 
 Peja
 White Drin

References 

 Mala Prosvetina Enciklopedija, Third edition (1985); Prosveta; 
 Jovan Đ. Marković (1990): Enciklopedijski geografski leksikon Jugoslavije; Svjetlost-Sarajevo;

Notes 

Geography of Peja District
Rivers of Kosovo